Accabonac Harbor is a natural harbor in East Hampton, New York near the Eastern end of Long Island, New York. The harbor is shallow and is a coastal wetland that is preserved and therefore is a winter habitat for waterfowl.

References

Bodies of water of Suffolk County, New York